Devon Makin (born 11 November 1990) is a Belizean professional footballer who currently plays for Police United and the Belize national football team as a midfielder.

He is the older brother of fellow national team member, Andres Makin Jr.

References

External links

1990 births
Living people
Belize international footballers
Belizean footballers
Premier League of Belize players
2013 Copa Centroamericana players
2013 CONCACAF Gold Cup players
2017 Copa Centroamericana players
Georgetown Ibayani FC players
Association football midfielders
Police United FC (Belize) players
Freedom Fighters FC players
Belize under-20 international footballers